The Troy Trojans, based in Troy, New York, were a minor league baseball team that existed on and off between 1885 and 1916. They first appeared in the Hudson River League in 1885 and 1886. After a year off they resurfaced in the International Association in 1888. They played in the Eastern Association in 1891, and in the Eastern League from 1892 to 1894, when they were replaced by the Scranton Indians. They joined the New York State League in 1899, replacing the Auburn Maroons and were in the league through 1916, when they were replaced by the Harrisburg Islanders.

The great Johnny Evers began his professional career with the Trojans in 1902 before moving to the Chicago Cubs later that year.}

References

External links
Baseball Reference

Baseball teams established in 1885
Baseball teams disestablished in 1916
1885 establishments in New York (state)
1916 disestablishments in New York (state)
Defunct minor league baseball teams
Defunct New York–Penn League teams
New York State League teams
Hudson River League teams